Tsunami was an imprint of Marvel Comics founded on January 1, 2003.

Overview
Marvel's goal was to create comic books that would appeal to manga readers. Other than in the art, the titles shared little in common, with, for example, Runaways and Sentinel being aimed at children and younger teenagers and Mystique touching on espionage and darker themes better suited for an older audience.

New Mutants, Mystique, Runaways, and Sentinel earned critical acclaim and a devoted fan following, Human Torch, Namor and Venom failed to generate interest, with the last surviving eighteen issues on the back of exceptionally high initial sales.

The imprint was discontinued in late December 2003. Mystique was the longest running title – lasting twenty-four issues, although it was absorbed into the mainstream Marvel Comics imprint and had a change of writer as part of the X-Men: ReLoad event after the thirteenth issue, while New Mutants, also part of ReLoad, was relaunched from with a new first issue as New X-Men: Academy X. At the same time,Venom and Runaways carried the imprint branding for the longest period, lasting until their eighteenth issues, after which Runaways was briefly cancelled before being relaunched as part of the Marvel Next initiative, while Venom was canceled outright. The other series were canceled after twelve issues.

Since then, Runaways has received a boost from high digest-sized trade paperback (TPB) sales, which was one of the reasons for its relaunch, while Sentinel was also revived, as a five-issue miniseries, for the same reason. Human Torch received a single digest, without signs of revival.

New Mutants received a single standard-size trade paperback compiling its first six issues and complete collections in the same format of its successor series, New X-Men: Academy X, New X-Men: Academy X, which was revamped shortly after House of M as simply New X-Men. Mystique and Venom were fully collected as standard-size trade paperbacks.

Titles
 Human Torch (2003–2004) #1–12
 Inhumans (2003–2004) #1–12
 Mystique (2003–2005) #1–13 only
 Namor (2003–2004) #1–12
 Sentinel (2003–2004) #1–12
 Venom (2003–2004) #1–18
 New Mutants (2003–2004) #1–12 only
 Runaways (2003–2004) #1–18
 Wolverine: Snikt! (2003 5-issue limited series)
 Emma Frost (2003–2005) #1 only

References

Marvel Comics imprints
2003 in comics